The 2014–15 Cupa României was the seventy-seventh season of the annual Romanian primary football knockout tournament. Astra Giurgiu, last season's title holders, were eliminated in the Round of 32 by the Liga II team Mioveni. Steaua București won the tournament.

First round
All matches will be played on the 16 July 2014

| colspan="3" style="background:#97deff;"|16 July 2014

	

	

|}

Second round
All matches will be played on the 30 July 2014

| colspan="3" style="background:#97deff;"|30 July 2014

	

	

|}

Third round
All matches will be played on the 13 August 2014

| colspan="3" style="background:#97deff;"|13 August 2014

	

	

|}

Fourth round
All matches will be played on the 26 August 2014

| colspan="3" style="background:#97deff;"|26 August 2014

	

	

|}

Fifth Round
All matches will be played on the 9 September 2014

| colspan="3" style="background:#97deff;"|9 September 2014

	

	

|}

Round of 32
All matches will be played on the 23, 24 and 25 September 2014

| colspan="3" style="background:#97deff;"|23/24/25 September 2014

	

	

|}

Results

Round of 16
All matches will be played on 28, 29 and 30 October 2014

| colspan="3" style="background:#97deff;"|28/29/30 October 2014

	

|}

Results

Quarter-finals

Semi-finals 

|}

1st leg

2nd leg

Final

References

External links
Summary - Cupa Ligii - Romania - Results, fixtures, tables and news - Soccerway

2014–15 in Romanian football
2014–15 European domestic association football cups
2014-15